The Danish Ladies Masters, known for sponsorship reason as the Nykredit Masters, was a women's professional golf tournament on the Ladies European Tour that took place in Denmark.

The tournament was first played in 2005 and the final edition was held in 2008.

In 2007, Lisa Hall won over Kirsty Taylor and Kiran Matharu on the first playoff hole for her third-career victory on the Ladies European Tour.

Winners 

^Reduced to 54-holes due to rain

See also
 Danish Ladies Open

References

External links
Ladies European Tour

Former Ladies European Tour events
Golf tournaments in Denmark